Lygodactylus is a genus of diurnal geckos with 81 species. They are commonly referred to as dwarf geckos. They are mainly found in Africa and Madagascar although two species are found in South America. Lygodactylus picturatus, the best known species, is found in Kenya and commonly known as the white-headed dwarf gecko.  Recently, illegal importation from Tanzania of brightly colored (and critically-endangered), Lygodactylus williamsi, known as electric blue geckos, has been gaining attention for Lygodactylus geckos in the reptile trade.

Since all trade in wild-caught Lygodactylus williamsi is illegal, shipments of these geckos are often intentionally mislabelled as Lygodactylus spp. or as Lygodactylus capensis. As some customs officials have difficulty identifying members of this genus, a Lygodactylus spp. identification guide has been published online by CITES.

Species
Species in alphabetical order by specific name:
Lygodactylus angolensis Bocage, 1896 – Angola dwarf gecko
Lygodactylus angularis Günther, 1893 – angulated dwarf gecko
Lygodactylus arnoulti G. Pasteur, 1965 – Pasteur's dwarf gecko, Arnoult's dwarf gecko
Lygodactylus baptistai Marques, Ceríaco, Buehler, Bandeira, Janota & Bauer, 2020
Lygodactylus bernardi V. FitzSimons, 1958 – Bernard's dwarf gecko, FitzSimon's dwarf gecko
Lygodactylus bivittis (W. Peters, 1883) – tiny scaled gecko
Lygodactylus blancae G. Pasteur, 1995 ‡
Lygodactylus blanci G. Pasteur, 1967 ‡ – Blanc's dwarf gecko
Lygodactylus bonsi G. Pasteur, 1962  – Bons's dwarf day gecko
Lygodactylus bradfieldi Hewitt, 1932 – Bradfield's dwarf gecko
Lygodactylus broadleyi G. Pasteur, 1995 – Broadley's dwarf gecko
Lygodactylus capensis (A. Smith, 1849) – Cape dwarf gecko, common dwarf gecko
Lygodactylus chobiensis V. FitzSimons, 1932 – Okavango dwarf gecko, Chobe dwarf gecko
Lygodactylus conradti Matschie, 1892 – Matschie's dwarf gecko, Conradt's dwarf gecko
Lygodactylus conraui Tornier, 1902 – Cameroon dwarf gecko
Lygodactylus decaryi Angel, 1930 – Angel's dwarf gecko
Lygodactylus depressus K.P. Schmidt, 1919 – Zaire dwarf gecko
Lygodactylus expectatus G. Pasteur & C. Blanc, 1967 – Ambilobe dwarf gecko
Lygodactylus fischeri Boulenger, 1890 – Fischer's dwarf gecko
Lygodactylus fritzi Vences, Multzch, Gippner, Miralles, Crottini, Gehring, Rakotoarison, Ratsoavina, Glad, & Scherz, 2022 
Lygodactylus grandisonae G. Pasteur, 1962 – Kenya dwarf gecko, Bunty's dwarf gecko, Grandison's dwarf gecko
Lygodactylus graniticolus Jacobsen, 1992 – granite dwarf gecko
Lygodactylus gravis G. Pasteur, 1965 – Usambara dwarf gecko
Lygodactylus grotei Sternfeld, 1911 – Grote's dwarf gecko
Lygodactylus guibei G. Pasteur, 1965 – western dwarf gecko
Lygodactylus gutturalis (Bocage, 1873) – Uganda dwarf gecko, chevron-throated dwarf gecko
Lygodactylus hapei Vences, Multzch, Gippner, Miralles, Crottini, Gehring, Rakotoarison, Ratsoavina, Glad, & Scherz, 2022 
Lygodactylus heterurus Boettger, 1913 – Boettger's dwarf gecko
Lygodactylus hodikazo Vences, Multzch, Gippner, Miralles, Crottini, Gehring, Rakotoarison, Ratsoavina, Glad, & Scherz, 2022 
Lygodactylus incognitus Jacobsen, 1992 – cryptic dwarf gecko
Lygodactylus inexpectatus G. Pasteur, 1965 – Dar es Salaam dwarf gecko
Lygodactylus insularis Boettger, 1913 – insular dwarf gecko
Lygodactylus intermedius G. Pasteur, 1995
Lygodactylus keniensis Parker, 1936 – Parker's dwarf gecko, Kenya dwarf gecko
Lygodactylus kimhowelli G. Pasteur, 1995 – Kim Howell's dwarf gecko, Tanzanian dwarf gecko, zebra dwarf gecko
Lygodactylus klemmeri G. Pasteur, 1965 – Malagasy dwarf gecko, Klemmer's dwarf gecko
Lygodactylus klugei (H.M. Smith, R.L. Martin & Swain, 1977) – Kluge's dwarf gecko
Lygodactylus laterimaculatus G. Pasteur, 1964 – side-spotted dwarf gecko
Lygodactylus lawrencei Hewitt, 1926 – Lawrence's dwarf gecko
Lygodactylus luteopicturatus G. Pasteur, 1964 – dwarf yellow-headed gecko, yellow-headed dwarf gecko
Lygodactylus madagascariensis (Boettger, 1881) – Madagascar dwarf gecko
Lygodactylus manni Loveridge, 1928 – Mann's dwarf gecko
Lygodactylus methueni V. FitzSimons, 1937 – Methuen's dwarf gecko, Woodbrush dwarf gecko
Lygodactylus miops Günther, 1891 – Günther's dwarf gecko
Lygodactylus mirabilis (G. Pasteur, 1962) 
Lygodactylus mombasicus Loveridge, 1935 – white-headed dwarf gecko
Lygodactylus montanus G. Pasteur, 1965 – Mount Ivohibe gecko
Lygodactylus montiscaeruli Jacobsen, 1992 – Makgabeng dwarf gecko
Lygodactylus nigropunctatus Jacobsen, 1992 – black-spotted dwarf gecko
Lygodactylus nyaneka Marques, Ceríaco, Buehler, Bandeira, Janota & Bauer, 2020
Lygodactylus ocellatus Roux, 1907 – ocellated dwarf gecko, spotted dwarf gecko
Lygodactylus ornatus G. Pasteur, 1965 – ornate dwarf gecko
Lygodactylus pauliani G. Pasteur & C. Blanc, 1991 – ornate dwarf gecko

Lygodactylus petteri Pasteur & Blanc. 1967 – Petter’s dwarf gecko
Lygodactylus picturatus (W. Peters, 1871) – white-headed dwarf gecko, painted dwarf gecko
Lygodactylus pictus (W. Peters, 1883) – robust dwarf gecko
Lygodactylus rarus G. Pasteur & C. Blanc, 1973 – thin dwarf gecko
Lygodactylus regulus Portik, Travers, Bauer & Branch, 2013 – prince dwarf gecko
Lygodactylus rex Broadley, 1963 – king dwarf gecko
Lygodactylus roavolana Puente, Glaw, Vieites, & Vences, 2009
Lygodactylus roellae Vences, Multzch, Gippner, Miralles, Crottini, Gehring, Rakotoarison, Ratsoavina, Glad, & Scherz, 2022 
Lygodactylus salvi Vences, Multzch, Gippner, Miralles, Crottini, Gehring, Rakotoarison, Ratsoavina, Glad, & Scherz, 2022 
Lygodactylus scheffleri Sternfeld, 1912 – Scheffler's dwarf gecko
Lygodactylus scorteccii G. Pasteur, 1959 – Scortecci's dwarf gecko
Lygodactylus somalicus Loveridge, 1935 – Somali dwarf gecko
Lygodactylus soutpansbergensis Jacobsen, 1994 – Soutpansberg dwarf gecko
Lygodactylus stevensoni Hewitt, 1926 – Stevenson's dwarf gecko
Lygodactylus tantsaha Vences, Multzch, Gippner, Miralles, Crottini, Gehring, Rakotoarison, Ratsoavina, Glad, & Scherz, 2022 
Lygodactylus tchokwe Marques, Ceríaco, Buehler, Bandeira, Janota & Bauer, 2020
Lygodactylus thomensis (W. Peters, 1881) – Annobon dwarf gecko
Lygodactylus tolampyae (Grandidier, 1872) – Grandidier's dwarf gecko
Lygodactylus tsavoensis Malonza, Bauer, Granthon, D. Williams & Wojnowski, 2019 – Tsavo dwarf gecko
Lygodactylus tuberosus Mertens, 1965
Lygodactylus ulli Vences, Multzch, Gippner, Miralles, Crottini, Gehring, Rakotoarison, Ratsoavina, Glad, & Scherz, 2022 
Lygodactylus verticillatus Mocquard, 1895 – Mocquard's dwarf gecko
Lygodactylus viscatus (Vaillant, 1873) – Howell's dwarf gecko, Copal dwarf gecko
Lygodactylus waterbergensis Jacobsen, 1992 – Waterberg dwarf gecko
Lygodactylus wetzeli (H.M. Smith, R.L. Martin & Swain, 1977) – South American dwarf gecko
Lygodactylus williamsi Loveridge, 1952 – Williams' dwarf gecko, turquoise dwarf gecko, electric blue gecko
Lygodactylus winki Vences, Multzch, Gippner, Miralles, Crottini, Gehring, Rakotoarison, Ratsoavina, Glad, & Scherz, 2022
Lygodactylus wojnowskii Malonza, Granthon & D. Williams, 2016 – Mt. Kenya dwarf gecko

‡ L. blancae (feminine, genitive, singular) is named for (Ms) Françoise Blanc, a French geneticist; but L. blanci (masculine, genitive, singular) is named for (Mr.) Charles Pierre Blanc, a French herpetologist.

Nota bene: A binomial authority in parentheses indicates that the species was original described in a genus other than Lygodactylus.

References

Further reading
Boulenger GA (1885). Catalogue of the Lizards in the British Museum (Natural History). Second Edition. Volume I. Geckonidæ ... London: Trustees of the British Museum (Natural History). (Taylor and Francis, printers). xii + 436 pp. + Plates I-XXXII. (Genus Lygodactylus, pp. 158–159).
Branch, Bill (2004). Field Guide to Snakes and other Reptiles of Southern Africa. Third Revised edition, Second impression. Sanibel Island, Florida: Ralph Curtis Books. 399 pp. . (Genus Lygodactylus, p. 245).
Gray JE (1864). "Notes on some Lizards from South-Eastern Africa, with the Descriptions of several New Species". Proc. Zool. Soc. London 1864: 58-62. (Lygodactylus, new genus, p. 59).
Mezzasalma M, Andreone F, Aprea G, Glaw F, Odierna G, Guarino FM (2016). "Molecular phylogeny, biogeography and chromosome evolution of Malagasy dwarf geckos of the genus Lygodactylus (Squamata, Gekkonidae)". Zoologica Scripta 46 (1): 42–54.
Puente M, Glaw F, Vieites DR, Vences M (2009). "Review of the systematics, morphology and distribution of Malagasy dwarf geckos, genera Lygodactylus and Microscalabotes (Squamata: Gekkonidae)". Zootaxa 2103: 1–76.
Röll B, Pröhl H, Hoffmann K-P (2010). "Multigene phylogenetic analysis of Lygodactylus dwarf geckos (Squamata: Gekkonidae)". Molecular Phylogenetics and Evolution 56 (1): 327–335.

 
Taxa named by John Edward Gray
Lizard genera